Hossein Rajaei Rizi is an Iranian Principlist representative of Iran's Islamic Consultative Assembly who was elected at the second period of the parliament elections on 12 September 2020—as the representative of Lenjan (Isfahan).

Hossein Rajaei Rizi who participated in the Mjales (parliament) elections as Lenjan-candidate, ultimately obtained 14127 votes, and won the competition with his rival (Ali Yousef-pour). Mohsen Kouhkan was the responsible in the mentioned position before Hossein Rajaei-Rizi—at the previous period of the Islamic Consultative Assembly.

See also 

 Islamic Consultative Assembly
 Somayeh Mahmoudi (Represents Shahreza and Dehaqan of Isfahan Province)
 Hossein-Ali Haji-Deligani (Represents Shahin Shahr and Meymeh County of Isfahan Province)

References 

Members of the 11th Islamic Consultative Assembly
Politicians from Isfahan
Living people
Islamic Consultative Assembly
Year of birth missing (living people)